Revolting People is a BBC Radio 4 situation comedy set in colonial Baltimore, Maryland, just before and during the American Revolutionary War. The series is written by the Briton Andy Hamilton and the American Jay Tarses, with Tarses playing a sour shopkeeper named Samuel Oliphant and Hamilton playing a cheerfully corrupt, one-legged, one-eyed, one-armed, one-eared one-nostrilled British soldier, Sergeant Roy McGurk, billeted on him.

Samuel's children are Mary, who is in love with McGurk's prim commanding officer Captain Brimshaw while at the same time operating as a notorious anti-British pamphleteer under the pseudonym Spartacus; Cora, in an unconsummated marriage with the pompous pro-British Loyalist official Ezekiel but nevertheless a mother; and the dimwitted Joshua, whose favourite recreation is wrestling bears.

Series 1 and 2 were released on CD in 2007–8. Repeats on the series now play on BBC Radio 4 Extra (formerly BBC Radio 7).

Cast 
Andy HamiltonSergeant Roy McGurk
Jay TarsesSamuel Oliphant
Sophie Thompson / Jan Ravens / Julia HillsMary Oliphant
James FleetCaptain Brimshaw
Hugh DennisEzekiel Spriggs
Felicity Montagu / Penelope NiceCora Spriggs (née Oliphant)
Tony MaudsleyJoshua
Susie BlakeMrs. Arbuthnot (Series 1)/Elizabeth Oliphant (Series 2)

Additional roles played by Philip Pope, Michael Fenton Stevens, Rebecca Front and the cast. Series 1 had guest appearances by William Hootkins as Samuel's brother Dan, and Timothy West as General Venables.
Produced by Paul Mayhew-Archer

Episode list

Series 1 (2000)
Originally ran in 2000. Revolved around the imposition of martial law in Baltimore and the springing up of a torrid, though also chaste, love affair between Oliphant's daughter Mary and an officer of the local British garrison, Captain Brimshaw. The show starts on 5 March 1770, the day of the Boston Massacre.
 18 JanuaryStorm Clouds
 25 JanuaryMore Storm Clouds
 1 FebruaryEven More Storm Clouds
 8 FebruaryTons of Storm Clouds
 15 FebruaryA Helluva Lot of Storm Clouds
 22 FebruaryAn Incredible Amount of Storm Clouds

This series was released on CD on 3 September 2007.

Series 2 (2001)
Originally ran in 2001. Less continuous than series 1 but developed the same theme with the added introduction of Oliphant's long-departed wife reappearing as a lesbian (to McGurk's lecherous satisfaction).  
 24 AprilTrying Times
 1 MayEven More Trying Times
 8 MaySome More Trying Times
 15 MayAnd Yet Even More Trying Times
 22 MayA Bunch More Trying Times
 29 MayStill in Trying Times

This series was released on CD on 7 January 2008.

Series 3 (2004)
The third series originally ran in 2004 and consisted of stand-alone episodes parodying various classic films with a final episode that turned the series on its head.  
 27 MayYoung Love
 3 JuneA Kiss is Just a Kiss (parodying Casablanca)
 10 JuneThe God-Given Talent
 17 JuneOver the Rainbow (parodying The Wizard of Oz)
 24 JuneThem Thar Hills (parodying gold rush westerns)
 1 JulySecrets And Lies

Series 4 (2006)
First broadcast in 2006, and repeated from 31 March 2007. The events of the final episode of the previous series are explained as having been a dream.

 2 MayEzekiel is KidnappedSamuel's pompous son-in-law, Ezekiel, is kidnapped by a rebel militia
 9 MayMcGurk Runs the ShopSamuel goes in search of his cousin
 16 MayGeorge WashingtonSamuel realises he's in the middle of a war when half his shop is burnt down by rebelling colonists and the other half by the British
 23 MayPiratesSamuel, McGurk and the others flee to England
 30 MayReunionSamuel, McGurk and the others arrive in London
 6 JuneThe KingSamuel, McGurk and the others finally meet King George III

Notes

External links
BBC website – Revolting People

BBC Radio comedy programmes
Works about the American Revolution
2000 radio programme debuts
George Washington
Baltimore in fiction
Province of Maryland
Thirteen Colonies in fiction